The Secretary of the Information and Communications Technology (Filipino: Kalihim ng Teknolohiyang Pang-Impormasyon at Komunikasyon) is the member of the Cabinet in charge of the Department of Information and Communications Technology.

The current secretary is Ivan John Uy who assumed office on June 30, 2022 and was confirmed by the Commission on Appointments on December 7, 2022.

List of secretaries of Information and Communications Technology

References

External links
DICT website

Information and Communications Technology